Amitermitinae is a disputed subfamily of "higher termites" now often merged with the subfamily Termitinae and is considered by ITIS as a synonym; it had previously been placed in the family Rhinotermitidae.

Amitermitinae have as typical characteristics: a usually rounded head with a bilobed clypeus. The mandibles of their soldiers usually has a single median tooth.

They have evolved the ability to have many reproductives in their colony, up to a hundred, which allows very large colonies. As with other members of their family, Termitidae, they have lost most of their cellulose-digesting protozoa. Instead, they eat fungi, which digest cellulose and other organic matter. As a result, the Termitidae can make use of a wide variety of foods; not only rotten wood, but also grass, seeds, dung, soil, and detritus  are all used by one species or another. In addition, some species can synthesize nitrogen compounds.

Many members of the Amitermitinae have evolved a very effective way of securing food. The Amitermes species especially build a shell of earth by cementing the earth with their saliva and use it to cover vegetation. This smothers the plant and they can then eat the fungi that grow in the safety of the covering. They probably evolved in savanna, monsoon, and desert regions because their runways are not very resistant to rain erosion They use saliva to build runways, and this is an adaptation of an earlier use of saliva to entangle enemies 

The cemented soil is richer in phosphorus than the soil from which it is derived. This causes an increased loss of phosphorus from sheet erosion. It is probably a major part of the reason why tropical savanna soils are depleted in phosphorus, especially in Australia. The genus Termes branch probably arose in Africa. The Amitermitinae are thought to have arisen in Southeast Asia, probably from primitive Oriental Termitinae species, in early Cretaceous but it may be even more likely in Australia, since that is where phosphate deposits were clustered in the late Jurassic and early Cretaceous. The primitive Amitermitinae species are most numerous in those regions at present. The development of at least 25 fundamentally different sesquiterpenes and several unique cyclic ethers for termite defense in the Amitermitinae  hint at considerable success and large numbers in the early years for such systems must be elaborate to evolve.

References

External links 
List of Amitrerminae
Proposed Taxonomy of the Order Isoptera
Charles Weber : Cretaceous Termites and Soil Phosphorus
Charles Weber : Termites Affect on Phosphorus in the Jurassic

Termites